Walter Dickinson (22 December 1895 – 1968) was an English professional footballer who played as a defender. In a playing career spanning 350 league matches, Dickinson played for Bradford Park Avenue, Sheffield Wednesday and Swindon Town.

References

1895 births
1968 deaths
Footballers from Sheffield
English footballers
Association football defenders
Bradford (Park Avenue) A.F.C. players
Sheffield Wednesday F.C. players
Swindon Town F.C. players
English Football League players